Jacques Renaud (13 December 1923 – 2 January 2020) was a French racing cyclist. He rode in the 1950 Tour de France.

References

External links
 

1923 births
2020 deaths
French male cyclists
Place of birth missing